Alonso Xuárez, (16401696), born in Fuensalida, Toledo, Spain,  renowned musician of the Spanish Baroque, and a disciple of Tomás Miciezes el mayor in the Convent of Las Descalzas Reales of Madrid. He worked as chapel master in the cathedrals of Cuenca and Seville.

He left a vast catalog of religious music, preserved mainly in the two cathedrals where he worked, but also it is possible to find his works in numerous cathedrals of Spain and in places as scattered as Munich and Mexico City.

He had prestigious disciples, such as the brothers Diego and Sebastián Durón, who acceded to outstanding posts due to his recommendations: the first one chapel master in the Cathedral of Las Palmas and the second as organist in Seville Cathedral.

History
Chapel master in Cuenca Cathedral – First Stage (1664–1675)
Chapel master in Seville Cathedral – (1675–1684)
Chapel master in Cuenca Cathedral – Second  Stage (1684–1696)

References

Bibliography
de la Fuente Charfolé, José Luis. "Nuevos hallazgos documentales y biográficos sobre Alonso Xuárez maestro de Sebastián Durón". Anuario musical 67 (2012): 3–18.
Martínez Millán, Miguel. Historia musical de la Catedral de Cuenca. Serie Música. Cuenca: Diputación Provincial, 1988.
Navarro Gonzalo, Restituto, Antonio Iglesias, Manuel Angulo, e Instituto de Música Religiosa. Catálogo Musical del Archivo de la Santa Iglesia Catedral Basílica De Cuenca. Publicaciones del Instituto de Música Religiosa de la Excma. Diputación Provincial de Cuenca. 2ª ed. Cuenca: Instituto de Música Religiosa, 1973.
Navarro Gonzalo, Restituto, Miguel Martínez Millán, Antonio Iglesias, y Jesús López Cobos: Polifonía de la Santa Iglesia Catedral Basílica De Cuenca. Cuenca: Instituto de Música Religiosa, 1970.
Stevenson, Robert: «Xuares [Juárez], Alonso» in The New Grove Dictionary of Music and Musicians, ed. by Stanley Sadie. Londres: Macmillan, 2001 [1980].

External links
Alonso Xuárez Project site , University of Valladolid.

1640 births
1696 deaths
Spanish Baroque composers
Spanish male classical composers
17th-century classical composers
17th-century male musicians